Homalolepis is a genus of flowering plants belonging to the family Simaroubaceae.

Its native range is Costa Rica to South Tropical America.

Species:

Homalolepis arenaria 
Homalolepis bahiensis 
Homalolepis cavalcantei 
Homalolepis cedron 
Homalolepis cuneata 
Homalolepis docensis 
Homalolepis ferruginea 
Homalolepis floribunda 
Homalolepis glabra 
Homalolepis guajirensis 
Homalolepis insignis 
Homalolepis intermedia 
Homalolepis maiana 
Homalolepis morettii 
Homalolepis paraensis 
Homalolepis planaltina 
Homalolepis pohliana 
Homalolepis praecox 
Homalolepis pumila 
Homalolepis rigida 
Homalolepis rotundata 
Homalolepis salubris 
Homalolepis suaveolens 
Homalolepis subcymosa 
Homalolepis suffruticosa 
Homalolepis tocantina 
Homalolepis trichilioides 
Homalolepis warmingiana

References

Simaroubaceae
Sapindales genera